The 1927 National Challenge Cup was the annual open cup held by the United States Football Association now known as the Lamar Hunt U.S. Open Cup.

Eastern Division

Western Division

Final

Lineups 
The finalists played as follows:

Sources

References

U.S. Open Cup
Nat
Fall River Marksmen